Malay Kumar Mazumder from Boston University was named Fellow of the Institute of Electrical and Electronics Engineers (IEEE) in 2012 for contributions to self-cleaning solar panels, and particle size and charge distribution analysis.

References

Fellow Members of the IEEE
Living people
Year of birth missing (living people)
Place of birth missing (living people)
Boston University faculty
American electrical engineers